Heidi Fraser-Krauss is chief executive officer at Jisc. She was appointed in  September  2021. Fraser-Krauss was previously executive director of corporate services at the University of Sheffield.

She holds a degree in psychology and management studies from the University of Glasgow and has previously worked at University of St Andrews and University of York. Fraser-Krauss has been chair of Universities and College Information Systems Association (ucisa), and chair of the Russell Group Universities IT Directors group (RUGIT). Her research area concerns how communication in teams supports innovation. Fraser-Krauss was named female CIO of the year by Computing Magazine in 2017.

References 

Jisc
People associated with the University of Sheffield
People associated with the University of York
Living people
Year of birth missing (living people)

Alumni of the University of Glasgow